Cape Tyl'sky (Mys Tyl'sky) is a prominent headland in Khabarovsk Krai, Russian Federation.

Geography
Cape Tyl'sky is located on the south side of Uda Gulf, near the mouth of the Tyl river, in the western Sea of Okhotsk. It rises to a height of 217 m (712 ft). There is a light atop a 22 m (72 ft) tower on the cape which operates from late July to late October.

History

American whaleships cruised for bowhead whales off the cape from 1858 to 1874. They called it South Head. They also anchored off the cape and sent boat crews on extended cruises to Tugur Bay.

References

Tylsky

ceb:Mys Tyl'skiy